The Hague Convention on the Civil Aspects of International Child Abduction, commonly referred to as the Hague Abduction Convention, is a multilateral treaty developed by the Hague Conference on Private International Law. The treaty provides an expeditious method of returning a child taken illegally from one country to another. It was concluded on October 25, 1980

As the US State Department would not voluntarily inform relevant actors about non-compliance of foreign countries in adhering to the Convention, Congress enacted an annual reporting requirement obligating the State Department to publish a detailed annual report on the reliability and effectiveness of the Convention to protect and secure the return of abducted American children in foreign countries.  It was hoped that the law would make available a unique and vitally important source of information to parents, courts, governments and attorneys worldwide.

The Compliance Reports have been issued for each year since 1999 with years 2002 and 2003 combined in a single report.

Initial reports were criticized for lack of information on what Congress sought. Over time the reporting of the US State Department improved until they began releasing a full accounting of the numbers of abductions reported to the State Department each year and the number of children recovered.

Congressional discord on reporting practices by the State Department

In April 1999, the US State Department, under congressional mandate, issued the 1999 Hague Compliance Report (1999 Report).  Congress immediately, and harshly, criticized the State Department for violating nearly every paragraph of the law stating that State had violated their express intent in creating it.

Congress imposed additional reporting requirements for the 2000 Hague Compliance Report (2000 Report) in section 202 of H.R. 3194, the Omnibus Appropriations Act of 2000 declaring that State's April 1999 Report on the Abduction Convention had failed to provide information consistent with the intent of Congress in having a full accounting of cases and countries in violation of the Hague Convention and a listing of countries which were non-compliant with the Convention.

Before submission of the 2000 Report to Congress, the Chairman of the Committee on International Relations, Congressman Benjamin A. Gilman of New York, wrote Secretary of State Madeleine Albright to remind her that the 1999 Report had "engendered a high level of criticism because of shortcomings in meeting the intent of Congress in mandating this report" adding that the amended Hague compliance legislation "emphasized the aspects that are of most importance to the Congress, and to the American people, in addressing the many concerns we have heard on this subject from our citizens."  In similar fashion, the Chair and Founder of the House Caucus on Missing and Exploited Children, Congressman Nick Lampson of Texas, also wrote Secretary Albright on September 15, 2000, to make it clear that "Congress takes this reporting requirement quite seriously" and express concern that "I have received word that the Department of State is considering submission of a 2000 report to Congress that I believe could be potentially more inaccurate and more incomplete with the statutory reporting requirements than the State Department's 1999 Report. Such a report would be unacceptable to Congress," and that, "I want to avoid any misunderstanding with the Department of State that might result in a deficient report and that would represent a step backward from the substantial efforts by Congress to improve compliance with the Hague Convention for the sake of American children and their parents, including major hearings by the Senate Foreign Relations (SFRC) and House International Relations Committees (HIRC), a unanimous Joint Resolution, statutory requirements to reform the Office of Children's Issues, the work of the Congressional Missing and Exploited Children's Caucus and individual senators and representatives, and a General Accounting Office investigation (showing very low return rates to the U.S. of abducted or retained American children)."

In regards to the Hague compliance report specifically, Lampson declared to Secretary Albright "I sincerely regret the two-year struggle with the State Department over this reporting requirement.  Congressional efforts in 1999 to clarify, broaden, and extend the reporting requirements were made substantially more difficult by State Department opposition. Nevertheless, the legislation was substantially amended in ways that should eliminate the Department's violations of many paragraphs of the reporting requirement last year."  Ignoring Congressional leaders, the US State Department issued the 2000 report in early October of that year and was still in blatant violation of five of the seven paragraphs in the amended reporting law.

2010 Compliance Report

The 2010 report covers the period from October 1, 2008, through September 30, 2009 (Fiscal Year of 2009.)  During this period the US State Department received 1,135 new requests for assistance in the return of 1,621 children to the United States from other countries.  In addition State received 324 Convention applications involving 454 children abducted to the United States from Convention partners of the United States.

The report also included a summary of the State's efforts to resolve 81 unresolved applications for the return of abducted American children under the
Convention from 18 treaty partner countries that remained unresolved in spite of having been prior to April 1, 2008.

In a sharp departure from previous practice the State Department listed three countries as not compliant and only one country as "Demonstrating Patterns of Noncompliance," whereas, in the 2009 report, it listed seven countries in the latter category.  Commenting on this "astonishing" occurrence, international family law authority Jeremy Morley noted 

The report itself did not explain or acknowledge this dramatic shift in the status of "Country Noncompliance Placement."

2009 Compliance Report

The 2009 report covers the period from October 1, 2007, through September 30, 2008 (Fiscal Year 2008.)  During this period the United States Department of State was notified of 1,082 new outgoing IPCA cases involving 1,615 children.  Of these, 776 were abductions to Convention partner countries.  Additionally State received 344 Convention applications concerning abductions to the United States involving 484 children.

As in years 2007 and 2008 the report included Honduras as fully "Not Compliant" with a list of countries "Demonstrating Patterns of Noncompliance."

2008 Compliance Report

2007 Compliance Report

2006 Compliance Report

2005 Compliance Report

2004 Compliance Report

2002 and 2003 Compliance Report

2001 Compliance Report

2000 Compliance Report

1999 Compliance Report

See also 

 Office of Children's Issues
 Hague Convention on the Civil Aspects of International Child Abduction
 Hague Convention 1996
 Human rights
 International child abduction in Mexico
 International child abduction in Brazil
 International child abduction in Japan
 Trafficking of children
 United States' Country Reports on Human Rights Practices

References

United States Department of State
Child abduction in the United States
1999 establishments in the United States
United States Department of State publications